Paradise Lake  may refer to:

Canada
Paradise Lake (Ontario), a lake in the Township of Wellesley
Paradise Lake (Quebec), an emerald-green lake near Matagami

New Zealand
Paradise Lake, a lake in Canterbury

United States
Paradise Lake, a lake in Alaska
Paradise Lake (California), a lake of California, in Butte County
Paradise Lake (Camas County, Idaho)
Paradise Lake, a lake in Sardinia, New York
Paradise Lake (amusement park), a defunct amusement park in Ohio
Paradise Lake (Washington), in northeast King County

See also
Paradise Lakes, three small lakes in west King County, Washington, US
Lake Paradise (disambiguation)